Kent Park is a GAA stadium in County Sligo in Ireland. It is the home of St Mary's. Kent Park is located in Ballydoogan, west of the coastal seaport of Sligo. It has hosted National Hurling League matches.

References

Gaelic games grounds in the Republic of Ireland
Sligo GAA
Sports venues in County Sligo